The theory of accessible categories is a part of mathematics, specifically of category theory. It attempts to describe categories in terms of the "size" (a cardinal number) of the operations needed to generate their objects.

The theory originates in the work of Grothendieck completed by 1969, and Gabriel and Ulmer (1971). It has been further developed in 1989 by Michael Makkai and Robert Paré, with motivation coming from model theory, a branch of mathematical logic.
A standard text book by Adámek and Rosický appeared in 1994.
Accessible categories also have applications in homotopy theory. Grothendieck continued the development of the theory for homotopy-theoretic purposes in his (still partly unpublished) 1991 manuscript Les dérivateurs.
Some properties of accessible categories depend on the set universe in use, particularly on the cardinal properties and Vopěnka's principle.

-directed colimits and -presentable objects
In particular, the ordinary directed sets are precisely the -directed sets.

Now let  be a category. A direct limit (also known as a directed colimit) over a -directed set  is called a -directed colimit. It is clear that every -presentable object is also -presentable whenever  , since every -directed colimit is also a -directed colimit in that case. A -presentable object is called finitely presentable.

Examples
In the category Set of all sets, the finitely presentable objects coincide with the finite sets.
In the category of all groups, an object is finitely presentable if and only if it is a finitely presented group, i.e. if it has a presentation with finitely many generators and finitely many relations.
In the category of left -modules over some (unitary, associative) ring , the finitely presentable objects are precisely the finitely presented modules.

-accessible and locally presentable categories
The category  is called -accessible provided that:

  has all -directed colimits

An -accessible category is called finitely accessible.
A category is called accessible if it is -accessible for some infinite regular cardinal . 
When an accessible category is also cocomplete, it is called locally presentable.

A functor  between -accessible categories is called -accessible provided that  preserves -directed colimits.

Examples

 The category Set of all sets and functions is locally finitely presentable, since every set is the direct limit of its finite subsets, and finite sets are finitely presentable.
 The category -Mod of (left) -modules is locally finitely presentable for any ring .
 The category of simplicial sets is finitely accessible.
 The category Mod(T) of models of some first-order theory T with countable signature is  -accessible.  -presentable objects are models with a countable number of elements.
 Further examples of locally presentable categories are finitary algebraic categories (i.e. the categories corresponding to varieties of algebras in universal algebra) and Grothendieck categories.

Theorems
One can show that every locally presentable category is also complete. Furthermore, a category is locally presentable if and only if it is equivalent to the category of models of a limit sketch.

Adjoint functors between locally presentable categories have a particularly simple characterization. A functor  between locally presentable categories:

 is a left adjoint if and only if it preserves small colimits,
 is a right adjoint if and only if it preserves small limits and is accessible.

Notes

References

 

Category theory